The A-222 Bereg ("Coast") is a Russian 130 mm self-propelled coastal artillery gun, which was developed in the 1980s (entering service in 1988) and was first shown to the public in 1993 at an arms fair in Abu Dhabi.

The Bereg artillery system consists of one command and control vehicle (CPU), a combat support vehicle (MOBD) and up to six weapon systems (SAU). All of them are mounted on 8×8 wheeled trucks. The AK-130 gun is mounted on a wheeled MAZ-543 8×8 vehicle and was designed to engage surface ships and fast attack boats as well as ground targets. It is capable of engaging targets within 1–2 minutes and can fire up to 12 shots per minute.

As of 2003, the only operator of the system was the 40th BRAP at the Russian Navy base in Novorossiysk, part of the Black Sea Fleet.

Weapon system specifications

Comparable weapons

Archer
ATMOS 2000
2S22 Bohdana
CAESAR
DANA
G6 Rhino
AHS Kryl
Nora B-52
PCL-09
PCL-161
PCL-181
PLL-09
Type 19 
ZUZANA

References

External links

 Video of the system in operation (YouTube)

130 mm artillery
Coastal artillery
Military vehicles introduced in the 1980s
Self-propelled artillery of Russia
Wheeled self-propelled howitzers